Grigoriy Demidovtsev (Russian: Григорий Демидовцев) is the pen name of Grigoriy Anatolyevich Petrov (Russian: Григорий Анатольевич Петров) (born 1960), a Russian fiction writer and a playwright. Since 2001 he publishes Biznes Segodnya. In 2014 he was awarded the A. K. Tolstoy Literary Prize.

Books
Demidovtsev wrote eight books of novels and a collection of stageplays:

 Breath of the Future
 Breath of the Past
 Russ we hadn't known about
 Breath of the Eternity
 The Little Bow
 The Demon of Temptation
 The Black Angel. In a Boat of Death
 Russian Mystery
 Plays

Some of them were translated into English to be collected in Fantastic stories.

Nevoruss 
In the Breath of the Past and Russ we hadn't known about, Demidovtsev depicts a fictional European country named Nevoruss. "Nevoruss" is the Russian word for "Neva Russ", literally "Russ at the Neva river". Nevoruss is considered to be a successor state of the medieval Novgorod Republic. It managed to avoid Muscovite conquest in the 15th century and due to commercial activity of its inhabitants continued to thrive. Thus Russia had never united, so its place shares Nevoruss and Muscovy. Their opposition resembles that of Jesusland and the United States of Canada. Besides Russian territories Nevoruss due to its early colonial expansion also controlled the Baltic states, Scandinavia with Iceland and Greenland, some parts of North America (including Alaska and the whole Canada) as well as some important islands (among them Cuba, Canaries and Hawaiian Islands).

References

External links 
 Grigoriy Demidovtsev at demidovtsev.ru

Russian male novelists
Russian science fiction writers
Russian dramatists and playwrights
Russian male dramatists and playwrights
Living people
1960 births